Higher disclosed fees and costs will be evident in products with higher asset turnover and higher transaction costs over the reporting period. 

In banking and accounting, disclosed fees is debt and equity underwriting, and advisory revenue reported by investment banks.

In investing, disclosed fees are typically found in investment, superannuation and pension products. Higher disclosed fees are common in products with higher asset turnover and higher transaction costs over a reporting period.

See also
Dealogic league tables
Thomson Financial league tables

Investment banking
Banking terms